Santiago Escobar Saldarriaga (born 13 January 1964) is a Colombian football manager and former player who played as a defensive midfielder.

Club career
Born in Medellín, Escobar played football for Atlético Nacional, Deportivo Pereira, América de Cali, Sporting de Barranquilla, Junior de Barranquilla, Millonarios and Deportes Quindío. He also appeared for the Olympic team.

Coaching career
Following his retirement from football, he became a football manager; he is known for leading Atlético Nacional to win the 2005 and 2011 Categoría Primera A. He also won the 2010 Copa Aerosur with Club Bolívar.

Personal life
Escobar is the brother of the murdered footballer Andrés Escobar.

References

1964 births
Living people
Colombian footballers
Footballers from Medellín
Association football midfielders
Atlético Nacional footballers
Deportivo Pereira footballers
América de Cali footballers
Atlético Junior footballers
Millonarios F.C. players
Deportes Quindío footballers
Categoría Primera A players
Colombian football managers
Estudiantes de Mérida managers
Atlético Nacional managers
Deportivo Pasto managers
Once Caldas managers
Atlético Junior managers
Independiente Medellín managers
Club Bolívar managers
La Equidad managers
Deportivo Táchira F.C. managers
C.D. Universidad Católica del Ecuador managers
Universidad de Chile managers
Venezuelan Primera División managers
Categoría Primera A managers
Bolivian Primera División managers
Chilean Primera División managers
Colombian expatriate football managers
Colombian expatriate sportspeople in Venezuela
Colombian expatriate sportspeople in Bolivia
Colombian expatriate sportspeople in Ecuador
Colombian expatriate sportspeople in Chile
Expatriate football managers in Venezuela
Expatriate football managers in Bolivia
Expatriate football managers in Ecuador
Expatriate football managers in Chile